Kyla-Rose Smith (born 10 September 1982) is a South African violinist, singer, and dancer, she performs with the Afropop musical ensemble Freshlyground, and with Kolo Novo Movie Band, a large ensemble that performs fusion music based on the music of Southeastern Europe. 

She is a former member of the hip hop music group Tumi and the Volume, and of the dance troupe Vuyani Dance Theatre. She left Vuyani Dance Theatre in 2003 when she decided to join Freshlyground.

Smith grew up in a suburb of Johannesburg with her brother (Tymon) and sister (Sydelle). She later trained in musical performance at the University of Cape Town.

At the Glamour Women of the Year Awards 2011 held on 25 July in Johannesburg, Kyla-Rose Smith was among eight women honoured by the South African division of Glamour. Glamour declared Smith and her bandmate Zolani Mahola "The Icons" of South African women in 2011.

References

External links
Kolo Novo Movie Band

1982 births
20th-century violinists
21st-century violinists
Living people
People from Johannesburg
21st-century South African women singers
White South African people
Women violinists
Freshlyground members